Midwest College of Oriental Medicine is a private for-profit university focused on Oriental medicine with locations in Racine, Wisconsin and Skokie, Illinois. The college offers education and clinical training in acupuncture and Herbal medicine including Chinese herbs, tui na massage, and nutrition.

History
Midwest College of Oriental Medicine was established in Chicago in 1979. The college later expanded to Racine.

Academics
Midwest College participated in the founding of the Council of Colleges of Acupuncture and Oriental Medicine, one of the parent organizations of the Accreditation Commission for Acupuncture and Oriental Medicine (ACAOM). Midwest College of Oriental Medicine has been accredited by ACAOM since 1993. Since 1996, the school has been formally affiliated with Guangzhou University of Chinese Medicine.

Master's degrees are awarded in Oriental medicine and acupuncture. The Oriental Medicine program takes at least three years to complete; graduates receive a master's degree. The acupuncture program requires a minimum of 2.5 years. In 2003, the school reported that its students had an average age of about 40 and that many had worked in other health-care fields, such as physical therapy or medicine.

Acupuncture and other services are provided in the clinics in which Midwest College students practice their skills; services are free to veterans.

References

External links
 

Acupuncture organizations
Alternative medicine organizations
Educational institutions established in 1979
Racine, Wisconsin
Universities and colleges in Chicago
1979 establishments in Illinois
For-profit universities and colleges in the United States
Private universities and colleges in Illinois